"Heart in a Cage" is a song by American rock band the Strokes. Written by lead singer Julian Casablancas, the song was released as the second single from the band's third studio album, First Impressions of Earth (2006). It was released in the United Kingdom on March 20, 2006.

The CD1 version of the single featured their cover of Ramones' "Life's a Gas" (and contains parts of two other Ramones songs; "The KKK Took My Baby Away" and "Don't Go") as a B-side, while the CD2 version featured an early version of the song "You Only Live Once" (previously named "I'll Try Anything Once"), along with the single's music video. The 7" vinyl includes "I'll Try Anything Once", performed by Nick Valensi on the keyboard.

Music video
The music video for "Heart in a Cage" was directed by Samuel Bayer, and was shot in New York City. It was shot in black and white and featured the band members playing in various locations in the city, such as on tall skyscrapers, or, in singer Julian Casablancas's case, lying down on the pavement. In an interview with Rolling Stone, Albert Hammond, Jr. stated he almost died on the set of the shooting of the video when 40 mph winds almost blew him off the top of the building. Hammond commented that "It's not like it's the first time I've almost died on a shooting for a music video."

Track listings
CD1
 "Heart in a Cage (Album Version)" - 3:26
 "Life's a Gas (Ramones Cover)" - 3:07

CD2
 "Heart in a Cage (Album Version)" - 3:26
 "I'll Try Anything Once ("You Only Live Once" Demo)" - 3:15
 "Heart in a Cage (Video)" - 3:26

7-inch vinyl
 "Heart in a Cage" - 3:14
 "I'll Try Anything Once ("You Only Live Once" Demo)" - 3:15

Japanese CD
 "Heart in a Cage (Album Version)" - 3:26
 "I'll Try Anything Once ("You Only Live Once" Demo)" - 3:15
 "Life's a Gas (Ramones Cover)"
 "Heart in a Cage (Video)" - 3:26

Chris Thile cover
The single was reworked with traditional bluegrass instrumentation in 2006 by mandolin virtuoso Chris Thile and Punch Brothers on the album How to Grow a Woman from the Ground. The song maintains several elements of the traditional bluegrass feel while still following the overall structure.

References

External links
 

The Strokes songs
Black-and-white music videos
2005 songs
2006 singles
RCA Records singles
Music videos directed by Samuel Bayer
Song recordings produced by David Kahne
Songs written by Julian Casablancas